Alphonse Schepers (27 August 1907 – 1 December 1984) was a Belgian racing cyclist. A native of the Flemish Brabant deelgemeente (part-municipality) of Neerlinter, Alphonse Schepers died in Tienen at the age of 77.

Major results

 Vuelta a España – 3 stages (1936)
 Liège–Bastogne–Liège (1931–1935)
 Paris–Nice
 1 stage & Final (1933)
 1 stage (1934)
 Paris-Rennes (1934)
 Tour of Flanders (1933)
 2nd (1934)
 Tour de France – 1 stage (1933)
 Paris-St. Etienne – 1 stage (1933
 Paris-Belfort (1932)
 Circuit du Morbihan – 1 stage & Final (1932)
 Bordeaux–Paris – 3rd (1932)
 National Road Championship (1931)
 National Cyclo-Cross Championship – 2nd (1931)
 Liège–Bastogne–Liège — version for Independents (1929)

References

Belgian male cyclists
Flemish sportspeople
1907 births
1984 deaths
Belgian Tour de France stage winners
Belgian Vuelta a España stage winners
Cyclists from Flemish Brabant
People from Linter